Delhi Belly or Delhi belly may refer to:

 Delhi belly or Travelers' diarrhea
 Delhi Belly (film), a 2011 Bollywood film

See also
 Montezuma's revenge (disambiguation)